Kerai Mariur (born June 4, 1951 in Ollei, Ngarchelong State, Palau) was the Vice President of Palau.

Biography 

His qualifications include a Major Degree in Business Administration and Higher Accounting received from Cannon's International Business College Honolulu United States. Serving in the Palau National Congress as a four-term member of the House of Delegates, Mariur has played a key role in the Economic and Environmental legislature of the Republic of Palau. Laws accredited to Mariur during his time served in Congress include the Marine Protection Act, Republic of Palau Copyright Act and Protected Areas Network Act. His appointments during his term in congress include Chairmanship of the Standing Committee on Youth & Cultural Affairs, Judiciary and Governmental Affairs, Environment and Ecology, and the Ways and Means of Financial Matters.

Johnson Toribiong selected Mariur to be his nominee for Vice President in the 2008 Palauan election. After winning the election, they were inaugurated on 15 January 2009. Mariur also became Minister of Administration and Finance.

References

External links 
 Palau House of Delegates: Kerai Mariur biography
 Palau Government website

1951 births
Members of the House of Delegates of Palau
Vice presidents of Palau
People from Ngarchelong
Living people